Black Theama (بلاك تيما) is an Egyptian band that was founded in 2004. The band's musical genre covers a wide range of styles from Nubian rhythms, reggae, hip-hop, and R&B, to music with other African influences. Through their music, they sing to "celebrate the black experience in Egypt."   According to Amir Salah, the band strives to maintain a sound true to the name they carry, which is unique, natural, and independent.  Black Theama tries to create music that does not fall in line with the "standard pop-music cliches."

"Our project is not to croon about starry-eyed love and teenage heartbreak. We assumed that there was a wide array of emotions and issues not yet tackled in contemporary singing, and we think that there is an insistent demand for that genre" - Ahmed Bahr, singer and co-founder of Black Theama.

Background

The group was founded by Amir Salah El Deen, who was originally in a theater group called "Karisma."  Together with his friend Mohamed Abdo, they met the third member of their future group, Ahmed Bahr, at one of their early shows.  They worked well together and decided to form a new group which became Black Theama.

Black Theama has collaborated with many other musicians over the years. Massar Egbari and Cairokee are just two of the Egyptian bands that Black Theama has performed with. Aside from the three core singers of Black Theama, many other musicians are also part of the collaboration. Among them was Weka Soliman current guitarist of Canadian rock band Special Ops.

Underground Following

The musical group is unique for its decision to remain an independent band.  Black Theama is not affiliated with any large commercial company within the music industry.  The group prefers to utilize their own resources to produce their music, recordings, and promotions.  Black Theama's fan base and underground following fund the band.  Their fan base is totally responsible for the band's success and ability to finance further music production. The cost of music production as an independent group can be expensive; the average cost of producing a record is between LE 100,000 and LE 600,000 Egyptian pounds. Black Theama has produced over 50 songs and a collection of music videos since its beginning.

The band strives to create music that reflects and captures the feel of daily life in Egypt, as well as their experiences as Egyptians from the South.

"It means being special, and being dark-skinned in Egypt... And people from the South have their own character, their own culture - even their tone of voice is different" — singer Mohammed Abdo.

Poets Ramy Yehia, Mido Zoheir, and Diaa el-Rahman have worked with Black Theama to create its unique sound and voice.  The band's lyrics reflect the life, issues, and politics of Egyptian society, including lyrics that the "marginalized and underrepresented youth" can relate to.

Black Theama often performs at the Bibliotheca Alexandrina (Library of Alexandria)  and at the El Sawy Culture wheel.

Nubian Influence

The Nubian region of Egypt is located in the south of Upper Egypt.  Black Theama infuses traditional Nubian folksongs into an alternative modern musical style that is growing in popularity.  The musical group has an authentic feel while presenting new sounds and lyrics.[

According to co-founder and singer Mohammad Abdo, "Southern music is one of the main tributaries of Egyptian music, and is a real part of our identity, not only because we originate from Nubia and are dark-skinned. We subconsciously came to recognize how much we’re affected by this unique character and culture, and moved by the music. We are always trying to work with the density of black music, including Nubian, and this provides our music with a distinct flavor."

Awards

Black Theama was nominated at the 2013 World Music Awards for Best Group, Best Live Act, Best Song, and Best Video Clip for the song Fi Belad Al-ayy Haga (released June 2013). Black Theama was the first musical group to represent Egypt, as well as the region, at the international competition.

Music
Black Theama has performed throughout Egypt, as well as in TV commercials and movie soundtracks.  During the 2013 Ramadan holiday season, Black Theama appeared in a Vodafone commercial.  The band also sang the song used for the opening credits of the movie 1000 Mabrouk.

Discography

Ghawy Bany Adameen, غاوي بني آدمين , released in April 2015, produced by Black Theama Productions, contains 14 songs : 
Enta Fakerny Hendy إنت فاكرني هندي
Kebert كبرت
Weenik وينك
Kol Mara كل مرة
Ousso Ousso أوسو أوسو
Set El Hosn ست الحسن
Lays Laha Mady ليس لها ماضي
Akhbar Ahram Gomhoreya أخبار أهرام جمهورية
Omaret El Nas عمارة الناس
Ya Beban Ya Aliah  يا بيبان يا عالية
Ala Shut El Neel علي شط النيل
Ya Prince El Layaly يا برنس الليالي
Koun Saied كن سعيد
Ghawy Bany Adameen غاوي بني آدمين

Bahar بحار, released in 2010
Kona Soghar كنا صغار
 Ouh Ah قرل اه
 Bahar بحار
 Ensan إنسان
 Eh Yaani ايه يعني  (This song, which means "What If," received wide popularity breaking into the mainstream.  The song describes a man who pokes fun at a girl who abandoned him, sung to a catchy melody.) 
 ٌYa Sadek يا صديق
 Andy Ser عندي سر
 Zahmet El Metro زحمة المترو
 Alo Al Hob قالوا ع الحب
Maghoun مجنون
Eflet Zemam فلت زمام
Zahma  زحمة
Black Theama, released Oct 8, 2013 under the label Arabian Collection.

Songs

 Hor حر
 Ahla Ayam أحلى أيام
 Eflet Zeman إفلت زمام
 Moka3ab Sokar مكعب سكر
 Kharasan خرسان
 Sa3at ساعات
 Gowaya (1000 Mabrok) جوايا -من فيلم ١٠٠٠ مبروك
 Bab El Donia (1000 Mabrouk) باب الدنيا من فيلم ١٠٠٠ مبروك
 Fe Belad El Ay Haga   في بلاد الاي حاجة

References

World music groups
Egyptian funk musical groups
Egyptian hip hop groups